The Lisburne Group is a geologic group in Alaska. It preserves fossils dating back to the Carboniferous period.

See also

 List of fossiliferous stratigraphic units in Alaska
 Paleontology in Alaska

References
 

Geologic groups of Alaska
Carboniferous System of North America